The Internal Revenue Service of Ghana is the Government of Ghana agency responsible for the mobilization of tax for the government.

It was merged to the Ghana Revenue Authority as a result of the Ghana Revenue Authority Act of 2009.

References
 

Ministries and Agencies of State of Ghana
Revenue services